Normandy tart is a shortcrust pastry-based (pâte brisée) variant of the apple tart made in Normandy filled with apples, sliced almonds and sugar, topped with creamy egg custard and baked until the topping is slightly caramelised. It is also known in French as la Tarte Normande.

This is a dish made in one of two sizes, one of which is just under one third of a metre (approximately one foot) in diameter, and a smaller variety, between a half and one third the diameter of the larger type.

The key difference from other similar tarts is that other egg custard tarts (a dish common in the United Kingdom) do not have the apple and almond topping (and tend to be made with a short crust pastry).

Another classic egg custard dish, crème brûlée tends to be prepared and served in a ramekin without any pastry or fruit topping and is given a fully caramelised top (by grilling a sugar topping until it is a hard, solid glaze).

Other apple tarts that probably originate in Normandy include a variety which, instead of egg-custard, has a layer of almond paste, or almond and apple paste, or frangipane almond pastry all topped with a pattern of semi-circular apple slices (some are decorated with a pastry lattice and most are made with short crust pastry).

In the UK, the French bakers chain Paul sells Flan Normand (only in the larger size in the UK) under this product name (and with apparently close adherence to the traditional 19th century recipe, where the topping and overall appearance is 'rustic') but many UK supermarkets (including Tesco) sell product under the name 'French Apple Tart' with no precise details provided concerning the regional source or historic provenance of the recipe. The supermarket product is typically of the 'apple and almond paste below apple slices' variety, without any egg-custard or semi-caramelisation, although the almond aspect is often referred to as being Frangipane.

See also

 List of almond dishes
 List of French desserts

Tarts
French desserts
Custard desserts
Norman cuisine
Almond dishes
Apple dishes